Joseph Gordon Coates  (3 February 1878 – 27 May 1943) served as the 21st prime minister of New Zealand from 1925 to 1928. He was the third successive Reform prime minister since 1912.

Born in rural Northland, Coates grew up on a cattle run and was bilingual in English and Te Reo Māori, the last New Zealand Prime Minister to be so. Coates took charge on the farm as a young age due to his father's mental illness, before becoming a Member of Parliament in 1911. He maintained a focus on farming issues and stood as an independent candidate. After distinguished service during World War I, he was appointed as Minister of Justice and Postmaster-General in the Reform government of William Massey (1919); he served as Minister of Public Works (1920–26) and Native Affairs (1921–28) and became prime minister in 1925 on Massey's death.

Defeated in the elections of 1928, Coates returned to government in 1931 as the key figure in the coalition government of George Forbes. Serving as Minister of Public Works (1931–33) and of Finance (1933–35), he instituted rigorous policies to combat the economic depression of the 1930s. He became a member of Peter Fraser's War Administration from 1940, serving as Minister of Armed Forces and War Co-ordination until his death.

Early life
Born at Ruatuna in Hukatere in Kaipara Harbour, New Zealand, where his family ran a farm, Coates took on significant responsibility at a relatively early age because his father suffered from bipolar disorder. He received a basic education at a local school, and his well-educated mother also tutored him. He became an accomplished horseman, although an accident left him with a bad leg for the rest of his life. The large Māori population of the area meant that Coates grew up proficient in the Māori language.  Gossip suggests that before his marriage, Coates had two children by a Māori woman. He allegedly became engaged to Eva Ingall, a teacher, but her father forbade marriage on the grounds that the illness of Coates' father might prove hereditary. Eventually, on 4 August 1914, he married Marguerite Grace Coles, better known as Marjorie Grace Coles, by whom he had five daughters.

Early political career 

While farming in Auckland, Coates became active in farmers' organisations. He first became involved in politics through the Otamatea County Council, to which he won election in 1905. Later, from 1913 to 1916, he served as the Council's chairman. He had previously distinguished himself as commander of the Otamatea Mounted Rifle Volunteers, and had a good local reputation. In the 1911 election, Coates won the Kaipara seat, having stood as an independent candidate aligned with the Liberal Party. In Parliament he generally voted with the Liberals, and formed part of the group that allowed Joseph Ward to keep his position as Prime Minister. When Ward resigned and Thomas Mackenzie replaced him, Coates declined the offer of a ministerial position.

Gradually, however, Coates distanced himself from the Liberal Party — primarily because of his strong belief in freehold for farmers, which the Liberals generally opposed. Coates had developed this belief due to his own experience with leasehold on his family's farm. When a vote of no confidence took place in 1912, Coates voted against the Liberals, helping the opposition Reform Party come to power. By 1914, Coates had formally joined Reform. He did not, however, act as a particularly partisan member, and made friends with politicians of many different political shades. His political activities  focused primarily on improving services for the Far North.

At the outbreak of World War I, Coates attempted to enlist for active service, but the Prime Minister, William Massey, dissuaded him from doing so by  — the Reform Party had only a tenuous majority. In November 1916, however, Coates finally gained permission to join up — he served with considerable distinction, winning a Military Cross and bar. When he returned to New Zealand, many saw him as a hero, and on 2 September 1919 Massey appointed him to Cabinet as Minister of Justice, Postmaster-General, and Minister of Telegraphs. He later became Minister of Public Works and Minister of Railways. From March 1921, Coates served as Minister of Native Affairs, where his knowledge of Māori proved a useful asset. He became a friend of Āpirana Ngata, and worked with him to help address Māori concerns.

Premiership 

Coates' prominence gradually increased to the point where people saw him as a natural successor to Massey. When Massey died on 10 May 1925, Francis Bell became Prime Minister on an interim basis while the Party debated its leadership. On 30 May 1925 Coates became Prime Minister, having defeated William Nosworthy in a caucus ballot.

Coates premiership was marked by an intention to develop the rural economy of New Zealand, from which he stemmed. To this goal, he dedicated a number of projects, such as the construction of the Kopu Bridge in the Coromandel Peninsula, which gave the local farmers better road access, and approving the construction of a Rotorua-Taupo railway which had long been sought after by settlers living between Rotorua and Taupo to open up the district.

As the Great Depression loomed and New Zealand's economy began to deteriorate, Coates and the Reform Party attracted considerable criticism. Albert Davy departed the party to help establish a Liberal revival known as the United Party. In the 1928 general election Reform and United Party won an equal number of parliamentary seats. With the backing of the Labour Party, United formed a government, and Coates lost the premiership.

Coalition 

In 1931, the Labour Party withdrew its support from United, protesting about various economic measures which it regarded as hostile to workers. Coates and the Reform Party subsequently agreed to form a coalition with United, preventing a general election in which Labour might have made significant gains. United's leader, George Forbes, remained Prime Minister, but Coates and his Reform Party colleagues gained a number of significant posts. William Downie Stewart Jr, Coates' colleague, became Minister of Finance.

In the 1931 general election the United-Reform Coalition remained in power, although Labour increased its share of the vote. Economic problems persisted, however, and unemployment continued to rise. Coates quarrelled with William Downie Stewart Jr over the government's response, and Coates himself became Minister of Finance. The Prime Minister, George Forbes, became increasingly apathetic and disillusioned, and increasingly Coates ran the government. Talk persisted about the emotional state of Coates.

In 1935, he was awarded the King George V Silver Jubilee Medal.

In the 1935 general election the coalition suffered a major defeat, winning only 19 seats: Coates nearly lost Kaipara. The Labour Party, which had won 53 seats, formed its first government and Michael Joseph Savage became Prime Minister.

Later political career 

After the defeat of the coalition government, Coates withdrew from public attention to a large extent. He experienced a period of financial difficulty resulting from the sudden loss of income, but his situation improved when a group of friends presented him with a large sum of money as thanks for his long service.

When United and Reform merged to establish the National Party in May 1936, Coates sat as a National MP. Some of his supporters urged him to seek the party's leadership, but others within the party believed that both Coates and Forbes remained too closely associated with the country's economic problems, and that the new party needed fresh faces. Forbes supported Charles Wilkinson for the leadership, but Coates and his supporters rejected this choice, going so far as to threaten a re-establishment of the Reform Party if it went through. Eventually, Adam Hamilton, a former Reform member, won the leadership ballot by one vote.

With the outbreak of World War II, the Labour government invited both Coates and Hamilton to join a special War Cabinet, which would be responsible for matters related to the war's prosecution. Their acceptance created a rift between them and their National colleagues — the party replaced Hamilton as leader over the issue, and relations between Coates and the new leader, Sidney Holland, deteriorated. Coates strongly believed partisanship misplaced during the war, and attempted to convince both Labour and National to work together. He expressed pleasure when the two parties established a joint War Administration, with the War Cabinet serving as its executive body. The War Administration quickly collapsed, with National choosing to resign. Coates and Hamilton openly criticised this decision, and the day after their resignation became effective, they rejoined the War Cabinet on the invitation of the Prime Minister, Peter Fraser. Coates thus became an Independent, and he decided that he would contest the next election as an independent National candidate, not as the National Party's officially-nominated candidate.

Death 
Coates' health, however, had begun to fail. He had smoked heavily for most of his life, and had also developed heart trouble. On 27 May 1943 he collapsed and died in his office in Wellington. The Labour Party eulogised him more strongly than did his National Party colleagues, although politicians from all sides of the House paid tribute to him.

Legacy 
Coates' style lived on through his mentee Keith Holyoake, later Prime Minister himself (1957; 1960–72), who saw Coates as his political role model. Both held each other in mutual admiration and respect and held shared views on opposition to socialism and state control while supporting individual freedom and private enterprise.

Coatesville a small town in Auckland north of Albany was called Fernielea until 1926, when it was renamed after Coates.

Notes

References

Further reading
 (this volume contains a chapter on Coates)

External links

The Prime Minister's message (1926)

|-

|-

|-

|-

|-

1878 births
1943 deaths
Reform Party (New Zealand) MPs
Independent MPs of New Zealand
New Zealand farmers
New Zealand finance ministers
Leaders of political parties in New Zealand
New Zealand foreign ministers
New Zealand National Party MPs
New Zealand military personnel of World War I
New Zealand Anglicans
People from the Northland Region
Prime Ministers of New Zealand
Leaders of the Opposition (New Zealand)
New Zealand recipients of the Military Cross
Members of the New Zealand House of Representatives
New Zealand MPs for North Island electorates
People from the Kaipara District
New Zealand members of the Privy Council of the United Kingdom
Candidates in the 1941 New Zealand general election
Justice ministers of New Zealand